4th VFCC Awards
February 2, 2004

Best Film: 
 Lost in Translation 

Best Canadian Film: 
 Les invasions barbares 
The 4th Vancouver Film Critics Circle Awards, honoring the best in filmmaking in 2003, were given on 2 February 2004.

Winners

International
Best Actor:
Sean Penn - Mystic River
Best Actress:
Charlize Theron - Monster
Best Director:
Peter Jackson - The Lord of the Rings: The Return of the King
Best Film: 
Lost in Translation
Best Foreign Language Film:
Cidade de Deus (City of God), Brazil
Best Supporting Actor:
Alec Baldwin - The Cooler 
Best Supporting Actress: 
Patricia Clarkson - Pieces of April

Canadian
Best Actor:
Philip Seymour Hoffman - Owning Mahowny
Best Actress:
Sarah Polley - My Life Without Me
Best Film: 
The Barbarian Invasions (Les invasions barbares)
Best Supporting Actor:
JR Bourne - On the Corner
Best Supporting Actress:
Rebecca Harker - Moving Malcolm

2003
2003 film awards
2003 in British Columbia
2003 in Canadian cinema